Hartney is a surname. Notable people with the surname include:

Brendan Hartney (born 1958), Australian rules footballer
Harold Hartney (1888–1947), Canadian-born American World War I flying ace
James Hartney (1848–1924), Canadian politician
Jordan Hartney (born 1988), Canadian swimmer